The 2005 OFC U-20 Championship was the fifteenth contested. It was won by Australia who qualified for the 2005 FIFA U-20 World Cup after a 3–0 victory against the Solomon Islands played at Lawson Tama Stadium in Honiara, Solomon Islands. The final game was abandoned in the 77th minute due to crowd trouble, however the score was allowed to stand. This was the last time Australia contested OFC U-20 Championship, as they moved to the AFC since 2006.

Participating teams

Squads

1. Danny Vukovic (Central Coast Mariners)
2. Mark Milligan (Sydney FC)
3. Trent McClenahan (West Ham United)
4. Adrian Leijer (Melbourne Victory)
5. Jacob Timpano (Sydney FC)
6. Stuart Musialik (Newcastle Jets)
7. Vince Lia (Melbourne Victory)
8. Blagoja Celeski (Perth Glory)
9. Jay Lucas (Marconi Stallions)
10. Kristian Sarkies (Melbourne Victory)
11. Chris Tadrosse (Melbourne Victory)
12. Justin Pasfield (Sydney FC)
13. Aaron Downes (Chesterfield FC)
14. Spase Dilevski (Tottenham Hotspur)
15. Ryan Townsend
16. Ruben Zadkovich
17. Nick Ward (Perth Glory)
18. Adam Federici
19. David Williams
20. James Wesolowski

1. Jacob Spoonley (Auckland City FC)
2. Cole Tinkler (New Zealand Knights)
3. Lj Pijnenburg
4. Michael Mayne
5. Steven Old (St. John's University)
6. Nadir Harrat
7. Jeremy Brockie (New Zealand Knights)
8. Sam Matthews
9. Kris Bright (Waitakere United)
10. Michael Gwyther
11. Prince Quanash
12. Jason Rowley
13. Joel Matthews
14. Hone Fowler
15. Sam Jasper (Waitakere United)
16. Ian Hogg (Central United)
17. Jason Hayne (Auckland City FC)
18. Elliot Stead
19. Croydon Wheeler
20. Roy Bell

Matches

Group stage

Group A

 withdrew

Australia and Vanuatu progressed to the semi-finals.

New Caledonia and Tonga were eliminated.

Group B

 withdrew

The Solomon Islands and Fiji progressed to the semi-finals.

New Zealand and Samoa were eliminated.

Knockout Phase

Semi finals

Third place match

Final

Australia qualified for the 2005 FIFA U-20 World Cup

Goalscorers
This list is not complete, as there are several missing match reports.

5 goals

 Alick Maemae
 Mark Bridge
 Jay Lucas

4 goals

 Osea Vakatalesau
 Benjamin Totori
 Kristian Sarkies

3 goals

 Jason Hayne
 David Williams
 Vince Lia

2 goals

 Apisalome Tuvura
 Maciu Samaidrawa Dunadamu
 Michael Gwyther
 Jean Maleb
 Alick Ismael

1 goal

 Kris Bright
 Stuart Hogg
 Charles Ligo
 John Simeon
 Malakai Tiwa
 Sumeet Shankaran
 Johnny Rao
 Nayzal Ali
 Goodwin Bebeu
 Ki Anufe

See also
2005 FIFA World Youth Championship

External links
Match Results 
Results by RSSSF

OFC U-20 Championship
Under 20
International association football competitions hosted by the Solomon Islands
2005 in Solomon Islands sport
2005 in youth association football